Henry Van Hoevenberg Jr. (September 1, 1879 – September 18, 1955) was an American football player and coach.

Early life and football career
Van Hoevenberg was born in 1879 at Kingston, New York. He attended Columbia University, where he played for the Columbia Lions football team at the end and quarterback positions from 1900 to 1901.  He was selected by Walter Camp as a third-team end on his 1900 College Football All-America Team. He graduated from Columbia in 1902 with a law degree. In September 1902, Van Hoevenberg was hired as the head football coach at Rutgers University, leading the 1902 Rutgers Queensmen football team to a 3–7 record in his only season as head coach.

Later life and death
Van Hoevenberg later moved to Alaska. At the time of the 1910 United States Census he was living in Valez Precinct, Alaska, and was employed as a lawyer.  He later lived in Sams Valley in Jackson County, Oregon for 27 years, operating a pear orchard and serving as the president of the Oregon State Horticultural Society.  The house he built in 1919 in Jackson County  has been listed on the National Register of Historic Places as the Henry Van Hoevenberg, Jr. House.

In 1937, he moved to San Francisco and became a labor negotiator. He moved to Seattle in 1939. From 1939 to 1945, he was employed as a labor negotiator by a consortium of salmon cannery owners.  In a draft registration card completed in April 1942, Van Hoevenberg indicated that he was employed by the Alaska Salmon Industry, Inc.

Van Hoevenberg was married to Jessamine Adele Bushnell in 1915. They had a daughter, Vivian Isabelle. Van Hoevenberg died in 1955 at Oakland, California.  He was buried at Lincoln Memorial Park in Portland, Oregon.

Head coaching record

See also
 National Register of Historic Places listings in Jackson County, Oregon

References

1879 births
1955 deaths
American football ends
American football quarterbacks
Columbia Lions football players
Rutgers Scarlet Knights football coaches
People from Jackson County, Oregon
Sportspeople from Kingston, New York
Players of American football from New York (state)
Oregon lawyers
American people of Dutch descent